Sanctuary is a Canadian science fiction-fantasy television series created by Damian Kindler. It premiered on Syfy on October 3, 2008. Kindler originally created Sanctuary as an eight-part web series, but later it was adapted for television. The series is set in the fictional city of Old City and follows centuries-old scientist Helen Magnus and her team: daughter Ashley; protégé Will Zimmerman; computer tech and Lycan Henry Foss; and an aptly named "Bigfoot"; and con artist Kate Freelander. The Sanctuary team assumes the mission of tracking "Abnormals" (specially gifted humans and creatures), and bringing them to the Sanctuary for the dual purpose of protecting the public as well as the Abnormals themselves.

Series overview

Webisodes (2007)

Television

Season 1 (2008–09)

Season 2 (2009–10)

Season 3 (2010–11)

Season 4 (2011)

Home media release

Notes

References 

Sanctuary
Episodes
Sanctuary
Sanctuary